Statistics of Úrvalsdeild in the 1939 season.

Overview
It was contested by 4 teams, and Fram won the championship. KR's Birgir Guðjónsson and Þorsteinn Einarsson were the joint top scorers with 3 goals.

League standings

Results

References

Úrvalsdeild karla (football) seasons
Iceland
Iceland
Urvalsdeild